Eugen Viktor Paul Seiterich (9 January 1903 in Karlsruhe – 3 March 1958 in Freiburg im Breisgau) was a German Roman Catholic clergyman who served as archbishop of Freiburg from 1954 until his death.

References

Sources
 
  
 Albert Raffelt: Bibliographie, Freiburg i. Br. 1997 (after F. Beutter 1959)

Archbishops of Freiburg
1903 births
Clergy from Karlsruhe
1958 deaths
20th-century Roman Catholic archbishops in Germany
20th-century German Roman Catholic priests